Nick Clarke (born 20 August 1967) is an English former footballer who played in the Football League for Chesterfield, Doncaster Rovers, Mansfield Town and Wolverhampton Wanderers.

External links
 

English footballers
English Football League players
1967 births
Living people
Wolverhampton Wanderers F.C. players
Mansfield Town F.C. players
Chesterfield F.C. players
Doncaster Rovers F.C. players
Bromsgrove Rovers F.C. players
Sportspeople from Walsall
Association football defenders